Murrayfield is an eastern suburb of Pretoria, South Africa.

References

Suburbs of Pretoria